Lebanon is a town in Dodge County, Wisconsin, United States. The population was 1,664 at the 2000 census. The census-designated place of Lebanon is located in the town, as are the unincorporated communities of Old Lebanon and Sugar Island.

History
The community has two parts, Lebanon and Old Lebanon. Old Lebanon was the original location, but when the first railroad was built several miles to the north, a large portion of the community relocated.

Geography 
According to the United States Census Bureau, the town has a total area of 36.0 square miles (93.3 km2), of which, 35.8 square miles (92.8 km2) of it is land and 0.2 square miles (0.5 km2) of it (0.53%) is water.

Demographics 
As of the census of 2000, there were 1,664 people, 610 households, and 473 families residing in the town. The population density was 46.5 people per square mile (17.9/km2). There were 631 housing units at an average density of 17.6 per square mile (6.8/km2). The racial makeup of the town was 98.56% White, 0.24% African American, 0.36% Native American, 0.06% Asian, 0.42% from other races, and 0.36% from two or more races. Hispanic or Latino of any race were 0.72% of the population.

There were 610 households, out of which 33.1% had children under the age of 18 living with them, 68.9% were married couples living together, 5.4% had a female householder with no husband present, and 22.3% were non-families. 18.4% of all households were made up of individuals, and 7.0% had someone living alone who was 65 years of age or older. The average household size was 2.73 and the average family size was 3.12.

In the town, the population was spread out, with 26.2% under the age of 18, 6.1% from 18 to 24, 29.0% from 25 to 44, 24.4% from 45 to 64, and 14.4% who were 65 years of age or older. The median age was 38 years. For every 100 females, there were 102.4 males. For every 100 females age 18 and over, there were 100.7 males.

The median income for a household in the town was $45,897, and the median income for a family was $50,250. Males had a median income of $32,458 versus $24,306 for females. The per capita income for the town was $19,063. About 3.3% of families and 5.6% of the population were below the poverty line, including 11.3% of those under the age of 18 and 3.3% of those 65 and older.

Organizations 
 Lebanon Volunteer Fire Department
 Lebanon Luckies 4-H Club
 St. Peters Lutheran Church (LCMS)
 Immanuel Lutheran Church (NALC)
 Lebanon Lutheran School
 Lebanon Elementary Public School (LEAP Elementary)
 Lebanon Band
 Lebanon Historical Society
 Lebanon Youth Baseball

Notable people

 Henry R. Moldenhauer, businessman and farmer, was born in the town
 Herman A. Ziemer, farmer and politician, was born in the town

References

External links
Town of Lebanon website

Towns in Dodge County, Wisconsin
Towns in Wisconsin